Karla Šitić (born 6 May 1992 in Split, Croatia) is a Croatian distance swimmer. At the 2012 Summer Olympics, she competed in the women's 10 km marathon. She eventually finished 12th, with a time of 1:58:54.7, 1 minute 16.5 seconds behind winner Éva Risztov.

References

Croatian female swimmers
Living people
Olympic swimmers of Croatia
Swimmers at the 2012 Summer Olympics
Female long-distance swimmers
1992 births
Sportspeople from Split, Croatia
Universiade medalists in swimming
Universiade bronze medalists for Croatia
Medalists at the 2013 Summer Universiade
21st-century Croatian women